Ebe Walter Tunnell (December 31, 1844 – December 18, 1917) was an American merchant and politician from Lewes, in Sussex County, Delaware. He was a member of the Democratic Party, who served in the Delaware General Assembly and as Governor of Delaware.

Early life and family
Tunnell was born at Blackwater, Delaware, near Clarksville, now Ocean View, Sussex County, Delaware, son of Nancy J. Long and Stephen Tunnell. After attending the public schools at Milford and Lewes, he ran the Blackwater general store started by his grandfather. He moved to Lewes in 1872, and operated a drug and hardware business there and was a member of the Lewes Presbyterian Church.

He was one of two Delaware governors who never married.

Governor of Delaware
Tunnell was a member of the Delaware House of Representatives in the 1871/72 session and Clerk of the Peace for Sussex County from 1885 through 1890. He was the unsuccessful Democratic Party candidate for Governor of Delaware in 1894, losing to the Republican Party candidate, Joshua H. Marvil. Two years later, in 1896, he was elected governor, defeating the Union (Addicks) Republican Party candidate, James R. Hoffecker, and the regular Republican Party candidate John C. Higgins. He served one term as governor from January 19, 1897, until January 15, 1901.

The Delaware Constitution of 1897, the state's constitution, was written and adopted during his term. It added some representation for New Castle County in the Delaware General Assembly, but reduced the representation of Wilmington, which was already the state's most populous part. Among many other changes, it created the office of Lieutenant Governor, allowed governors to be elected to a second term and gave them a legislative veto, reduced judges' terms from life to 12 years, and eliminated the poll tax. It was also during his term that the General Incorporation Law was passed, creating the favorable business environment that has resulted in Delaware becoming the preferred place in the U.S. for companies to incorporate.

Death and legacy
After his term ended, Tunnell returned to Lewes, where he became president of the Farmers' Bank of Delaware, a director of the Delaware, Maryland and Virginia Railroad, and owner of the Delaware Pilot. He died at Lewes, and is buried there in the Lewes Presbyterian Church cemetery.

Almanac
Elections are held the first Tuesday after November 1. Members of the Delaware General Assembly took office the first Tuesday of January. State representatives have a two-year term. The governor takes office the third Tuesday of January and has a four-year term.

References

Images
Hall of Governors Portrait Gallery Portrait courtesy of Historical and Cultural Affairs, Dover.

External links
Biographical Directory of the Governors of the United States
Delaware’s Governors

The Political Graveyard

Places with more information
Delaware Historical Society; website; 505 North Market Street, Wilmington, Delaware 19801; (302) 655-7161
University of Delaware; Library website; 181 South College Avenue, Newark, Delaware 19717; (302) 831-2965

1844 births
1917 deaths
American Presbyterians
People from Lewes, Delaware
Democratic Party members of the Delaware House of Representatives
Democratic Party governors of Delaware
Burials in Sussex County, Delaware
19th-century American politicians
People from Ocean View, Delaware
County officials in Delaware